İsmail Yüksek (born 26 January 1999) is a Turkish professional footballer who plays as a central midfielder for Süper Lig side Fenerbahçe and the Turkey national team.

Professional career

Youth and Gölcükspor
Yüksek began his youth career with hometown club Bursaspor and also played in youth level with Bursa Merinosspor, Yeşil Bursa, Yıldırım Belediyespor and Bursa Yıldırımspor. He started his professional career with Gölcükspor and played two successful season with them.

Fenerbahçe
He signed 5 years contract with Fenerbahçe on 2 May 2020.

Loan to Balıkesirspor
After signed with Fenerbahçe, he briefly joined Balıkesirspor on loan.

2020-21 season
He returned to Fenerbahçe in January 2021. Yüksek made his professional debut with Fenerbahçe in a 3-1 Süper Lig win over MKE Ankaragücü on 18 January 2021.

Loan to Adana Demirspor
On 5 February 2021, he joined Adana Demirspor on loan in the TFF First League for the second half of the 2020-21 season.

Loan to Bursaspor
He was on loan with Bursaspor for the 2021-22 season, before returning to Fenerbahçe.

2022–23 season
After return to Fenerbahçe, he made a very strong start to the 2022–23 season with coach Jorge Jesus, made good use of his first 11 chances and called to the national team. On October 6, he was selected man of the match by supporters votes for his performance in the 2022–23 UEFA Europa League Group B third week AEK Larnaca match.

On 20 January 2023, Fenerbahçe announced to sign new contract with him until May 2027.

Career statistics

Club

International
He played his international debut at 81st minute late substitute and scored his first International goal at 87th minute against Luxembourg. He didn't select to the Turkey youth national teams and directly played for senior level.

Scores and results show Turkey's goal tally first, score column indicates score after each Ismail goal.

References

External links
 
 

1999 births
Living people
People from İznik
Turkish footballers
Turkey international footballers
Fenerbahçe S.K. footballers
Balıkesirspor footballers
Adana Demirspor footballers
Bursaspor footballers
Süper Lig players
TFF First League players
TFF Third League players
Association football midfielders